Petr Skoumal (7 March 1938 – 28 September 2014) was a Czech musician and composer.

Skoumal focused on film music. He also composed music for animated shorts (i.e. Maxipes Fik). In the past he made several stage performances with Jan Vodňanský in The Drama Club in Prague. After the break-up of the duo he made several albums for adults, echoing the communist times (i.e. Half-life, March). In the 90s he started a series of albums for children, based on the stories of Emanuel Frynta, Pavel Šrut and Jan Vodňanský (i.e. If the Pig Had Wings, Pastries, How to hunt a Gorilla). The former was made into a stage performance for Divadlo v Dlouhé.

He was a son of the notable Czech translator Aloys Skoumal.

He died in 2014 at age of 76. His funeral was held at the Strašnice Crematorium in Prague.

References

External links

1938 births
Czech jazz musicians
Czech jazz pianists
Czech songwriters
2014 deaths
20th-century pianists
Etc (band) members